Jorge Huneeus Gana (10 April 1866 – 2 July 1926) was a Chilean attorney, writer, journalist, ambassador, legislative deputy, and cabinet minister.

Family

He was married to Elena Lavín Recasens and had five children with her: Elena, Jorge, Berta, Sergio Luis, and Gabriela.

Education
He was admitted to the College of Ballacey in 1872 and remained there for two years. In 1874 he began his secondary studies at the College of the French Fathers in Santiago. He finished his schooling in 1883, at age 17.

In 1884 he enrolled at the University of Chile to study law, and was admitted to the bar on 9 April 1888, at age 22.

Private life

In 1886, while still a college student, Jorge Huneeus Gana taught literature and history at the Chilean Army War Academy. In 1887 he taught history and law classes there.

The following are highlights of his written works:
 Brief historical review of the Chilean Constitution of 1833
 Motta: historical study
 Assessment of the Errázuriz administration and conservative government (1900)
 The Argentina-Chile friendship. The true origin of the Pacts of May. (1908)
 Historical picture of the intellectual output of Chile, Volume I (1910)
 Portales: historical study (1918)
 Chilean Writers' Library, historical picture of the intellectual evolution of Chile

The arts were Huneeus Gana's great devotion, especially music, painting, and poetry. He was a significant collector of paintings. As a journalist he collaborated on two newspapers, La Patria de Valparaíso (a daily published from 1 August 1863 to 1896) and La Ley (which he edited from its foundation on 10 June 1884, under the pseudonym "Suaviter in modo"). During the Revolution of 1891 he was editor of the Official Bulletin of the Government Junta.

He served as secretary of legal letters of Santiago in 1889 and as director of the Bulletin of Acts and Decrees of the Supreme Government in 1889.

He was also known for his close group of friends, headed by poet Rubén Darío, with Pedro Montt and Agustín Edwards Mac-Clure who were linked to the newspaper La Época where he worked. He was also associated with a group of outstanding young people, including Luis Orrego Luco, Pedro Balmaceda, Carlos Luis Hübner, and Vicente Grez.

Public life
Jorge Huneeus Gana was an official of the Ministry of Foreign Affairs, Worship and Colonization.

He was a member of the Radical Party beginning in 1892, and was the Secretary of its Central Committee that year.

During the government of Pedro Montt he was named Minister of Justice and Public Instruction for the brief period from 22 January to 15 June 1909. He was deputy for Llanquihue, Carelmapu, and Osorno for the terms 1897–1900, 1900–1903, 1903–1906, and 1906–1909. He integrated several Commissions: Finance; Constitution, Legislation, and Justice; Law and Justice; Charity and Worship; and Foreign Affairs. He was a replacement member of the Conservation Commission for the recess of 1906–1907.

Ambassador
After finishing his last term as deputy, he served as Minister Plenipotentiary in Belgium and the Netherlands for six years (1912–1918).

Album of Isidora Zegers de Huneeus

Olga Lindholm Hunneus, daughter of Elena Huneeus Lavín, granddaughter of Jorge Huneeus Gana, and great-great-granddaughter of Isidora Zegers de Huneeus was the owner of the album, which had been a gift from her grandfather when she was just five years old. She related that after the death of Isidora Zegers in 1869, the album went to her great-grandfather, . She further clarified:

See also
 Arturo Alessandri
 History of Chile during the Parliamentary Era (1891–1925)
 Pedro Montt
 Pedro Nolasco Cruz Vergara
 Ramón Barros Luco

References

1866 births
1926 deaths
People from Santiago
Chilean people of German descent
Chilean people of Basque descent
Chilean Roman Catholics
Radical Party of Chile politicians
Government ministers of Chile
Deputies of the XXV Legislative Period of the National Congress of Chile
Deputies of the XXVI Legislative Period of the National Congress of Chile
Deputies of the XXVII Legislative Period of the National Congress of Chile
Deputies of the XXVIII Legislative Period of the National Congress of Chile
19th-century Chilean lawyers
University of Chile alumni